The Clock Tower (Turkish: Saat Kulesi) of Podgorica, Montenegro, is located at Bećir Beg Osmanagić square, in the Stara Varoš neighborhood. It is one of the very few Ottoman landmarks that survived the bombing of Podgorica in World War II.

History
Sahat Kula was built in 1667, by Hadži-paša Osmanagić, a prominent citizen of Podgorica. It is a freestanding 19m tall stone clock tower. 

Its current turret clock mechanism was made in 1890 by Pietro Colbachini foundry in Bassano del Grappa, Italy, after Podgorica was incorporated into Montenegro (original mechanism was made in Austria). Around the same time, a metal cross was installed at the top of the tower, symbolizing transfer of the city from the Ottomans into the hands of Christian Montenegrins. The cross was made by Stevan Radović, Lazar Radović's grandfather. 

Today, Sahat kula is an important cultural monument of Montenegro, protected by law. The clock was renovated in January 2012, when new electric mechanism was installed, as old one is kept for historic significance only.

References

Podgorica
Towers completed in 1667
Buildings and structures in Podgorica
Clock towers in Montenegro
Tourist attractions in Podgorica
Ottoman architecture in Montenegro
1667 establishments in the Ottoman Empire